Find a Way may refer to:

 "Find a Way" (Amy Grant song), a 1985 pop song by Amy grant
 "Find a Way" (A Tribe Called Quest song), a 1998 alternative hip hop song by A Tribe Called Quest
 "Find a Way" (Alessandra Amoroso song), a 2009 pop song by Italian performer Alessandra Amoroso
 "Find A Way", a song by Kwesta featuring Kruna and Soweto Gospel Choir